Peter Scharf (born 15 July 1953) is a German ice hockey player. He competed in the men's tournaments at the 1980 Winter Olympics and the 1984 Winter Olympics.

References

External links
 

1953 births
Living people
German ice hockey players
Olympic ice hockey players of West Germany
Ice hockey players at the 1980 Winter Olympics
Ice hockey players at the 1984 Winter Olympics
People from Bad Tölz
Sportspeople from Upper Bavaria